Bukovac Perušićki is a village in Perušić, Croatia. The 2011 population was 91.

References

Populated places in Lika-Senj County